Arthuriomyces peckianus is a fungal plant pathogen, which causes orange rust on members of the genus Rubus, and various species of berries. It is found in central and eastern North America, and Eurasia.

References

Fungal plant pathogens and diseases
Small fruit diseases
Pucciniales
Fungi described in 1873
Fungi of Asia
Fungi of Europe
Fungi of North America